Farrapos (meaning Ragamuffins in English, in allusion to the Ragamuffin War) is a neighbourhood (bairro) in the city of Porto Alegre, the state capital of Rio Grande do Sul, in Brazil. It was created by Law 6218 from November 17, 1988.

Neighbourhoods in Porto Alegre
Populated places established in 1988